First National Bank in Fleetwood, (also known as the First National Bank of Fleetwood or Kutz Brothers Store or Hosiery Mill) is a historic home located at Fleetwood, Berks County, Pennsylvania.

Description and history 
It was built in 1898 and remodeled to its present form between 1919 and 1921. It was originally built as a store and light manufacturing facility, but converted to use as a bank at the time of remodeling.

It was listed on the National Register of Historic Places on May 20, 2005.

References

Commercial buildings on the National Register of Historic Places in Pennsylvania
Renaissance Revival architecture in Pennsylvania
Commercial buildings completed in 1898
Buildings and structures in Berks County, Pennsylvania
1898 establishments in Pennsylvania
National Register of Historic Places in Berks County, Pennsylvania